Yu Shuhong (born August 1967) is a Chinese chemist and materials scientist and professor at the University of Science and Technology of China.

Early life and education
Yu was born in Lujiang County, Anhui in August 1967. In July 1988 he graduated from Hefei University of Technology. He received his master's degree from Shanghai Research institute of Chemical Industry and in 1991, and completed his doctoral work in 1998 at the University of Science and Technology of China  under the supervision of Qian Yitai.

Career
In 1999 he became researcher at the Laboratory of Materials and Structures, Tokyo University of Technology. In 2001 he became researcher at the Max Planck Institute of Colloids and Interfaces in Potsdam. Yu returned to China in 2002 and that same year became doctoral supervisor at the University of Science and Technology of China.

Honours and awards
 2001 State Natural Science Award (Second Class)
 2003 Distinguished Young Scholar by the National Science Fund 
 2006 "Chang Jiang Scholar" (or "Yangtze River Scholar")
 2013 Fellow of the Royal Society of Chemistry
 November 22, 2019 Member of the Chinese Academy of Sciences (CAS)

References

1967 births
People from Lujiang County
Living people
Chemists from Anhui
Hefei University of Technology alumni
University of Science and Technology of China alumni
Members of the Chinese Academy of Sciences
Fellows of the Royal Society of Chemistry
Academic staff of the University of Science and Technology of China
Chinese materials scientists